Choreocolax is a genus of red algae in the order Ceramiales

References

Red algae genera
Ceramiales
Parasitic eukaryotes